This is a list of railway bridges over the Rhine.

Railway Crossings
Existing and former railway bridges, with the nearest train stations on the left and right banks:

Vorderrhein
 Switzerland
 A total of five bridges on the line, Andermatt – Reichenau-Tamins (all single tracked, electrified,  gauge)

Hinterrhein
 Switzerland
 A total of two bridges on the line, Filisur – Reichenau-Tamins (both single tracked, electrified,  gauge)

Alpenrhein
 Switzerland
 At Untervaz (industrial branch line, single tracked and non-electrified, combined 1005 mm and  gauge)
 Between Bad Ragaz and Maienfeld (double tracked, electrified,  gauge)
 Liechtenstein and Switzerland
 Between Schaan and Buchs, St. Gallen (single tracked, electrified)
 Austria and Switzerland
 A total of two bridges of the Internationale Rheinregulierungsbahn (both single tracked, electrified,  gauge)
 Between Lustenau and St. Margrethen (single tracked, electrified)

Hochrhein

 Germany
 Old Rhine Bridge between Konstanz Hbf and Konstanz-Petershausen (single tracked, electrified)
 Switzerland
 Between Etzwillen and Hemishofen (single tracked, non electrified, line closed for traffic)
 Between Feuerthalen and Schaffhausen (single tracked, electrified)
 Rheinfall railway bridge, between Schloss Laufen am Rheinfall and Neuhausen am Rheinfall stations (single tracked, electrified, with pedestrian walkways)
 Eglisau railway bridge between Eglisau and Hüntwangen-Wil stations (single tracked, electrified)
 Switzerland and Germany
 Waldshut–Koblenz Rhine Bridge between Koblenz, Switzerland and Waldshut-Tiengen (single tracked, electrified)
 Switzerland
 Between Basel SBB railway station and Basel Badischer Bahnhof on the Basel Connecting Line (two separate bridges, four tracks, electrified)

Upper Rhine

 France and Germany
 Between Huningue and Weil am Rhein (single tracked, destroyed in World War II)
 Between Chalampé and Neuenburg (single tracked, electrified, freight only — passenger service only on weekends)
 Between Neuf-Brisach and Breisach (single tracked, destroyed in WW2)
 Between Strasbourg and Kehl (double tracked from December 2010 for the first time since 1944, electrified: single tracked 1956 - 2010.)
 Between Rœschwoog and Rastatt-Wintersdorf (double tracked, used as street bridge since 1949, line closed 1960, rails were preserved for strategic purpose until 1999)
 Germany
 Maxau Rhine Bridge between Karlsruhe-Maxau and Wörth am Rhein-Maximiliansau (double tracked, electrified)
 Germersheim Rhine Bridge between Germersheim and Philippsburg (single tracked, electrified)
 Konrad Adenauer Bridge between Ludwigshafen and Mannheim (four tracks, electrified; also road bridge with tram line)
 Rhine Bridge between Worms-Brücke and Hofheim (double tracked, electrified)
 Südbrücke, Mainz, between Mainz-Süd and Mainz-Gustavsburg (double tracked, electrified)
 Kaiser Bridge between Mainz-Nord and Wiesbaden-Ost (double tracked, electrified)

Middle Rhine
 Germany
 Hindenburg Bridge between Rüdesheim/Geisenheim and Münster-Sarmsheim/Ockenheim (double tracked, destroyed in WW2)
 Horchheim rail bridge between Koblenz Hbf and Niederlahnstein on Lahntal railway (double tracked, electrified)
 Between Koblenz-Lützel and Neuwied on Neuwied–Koblenz line (double tracked, electrified)
 Ludendorff Bridge between Sinzig/Bad Bodendorf and Unkel (double tracked, destroyed in WW2)

Lower Rhine

 Germany
 Two bridges at Cologne:
 The South Bridge south of the City (double tracked, electrified)
 The Hohenzollernbrücke between Köln Hauptbahnhof and Köln Messe/Deutz railway station (six tracks, electrified)
 The Hamm Railway Bridge between Neuss-Rheinpark Center and Düsseldorf-Hamm (four tracks, electrified)
 The Duisburg-Hochfeld Railway Bridge between Rheinhausen-Ost and Duisburg-Hochfeld Süd (double tracked, electrified)
 The Haus-Knipp railway bridge between Moers and Duisburg-Beeck (double tracked, electrified, freight only)
 The Wesel Railway Bridge between Büderich and Wesel (double tracked, destroyed in World War II)
Netherlands (in the delta, the river splits and its name changes often)
 Nijmegen railway bridge between Nijmegen and Nijmegen Lent railway station, across the Waal River (Rhine delta, main branch) - (double tracked, electrified)
 Between Zaltbommel and Geldermalsen across the Waal River, made famous in a poem by Martinus Nijhoff - (double tracked, electrified)
 At Sliedrecht, across Beneden Merwede - (single track)
 At Rotterdam, across Nieuwe Maas (joint Rhine-Meuse River mouth), former bridge; now replaced by a tunnel (four tracks, electrified).
 At Rotterdam, across Nieuwe Maas-Koningshaven, former bridge 'De Hef' — replaced by a tunnel, disfunct, industrial monument (two tracks, electrified)
 Between Rotterdam and Dordrecht, across Oude Maas, two bridges - (each double tracked, electrified)
 South of Rotterdam, 'HSL' tunnel below Oude Maas - (double tracked, electrified)
 South of Rotterdam, main bridge at Moerdijk across Hollands Diep - (double tracked, electrified)
 South of Rotterdam, 'HSL' second railway bridge - (double tracked, electrified, hi-speed)
 Near Alblasserdam, a tunnel below Noord (a branch near Rotterdam) - (two tracks, electrified; freight only: Rotterdam - Ruhr Area link-up 'Betuwelijn', built 2001-2006).
 Between Bemmel and Zevenaar, tunnel below Pannerdens Kanaal (1707 AD dug section of Rhine's second-largest delta branch) - (two tracks, electrified; freight only: Rotterdam - Ruhr Area link-up 'Betuwelijn', built 2001-2006)
 At Arnhem, across Nederrijn (Rhine delta, second-largest branch) - (two tracks, electrified)
 At Rhenen, across Nederrijn - former double tracked rail bridge, destroyed in World War II.
 Between Culemborg and Houten, across the Lek River (Rhine delta, second-largest branch farther downstream) - (two tracks, electrified)
 At Westervoort, across IJssel - (two tracks, electrified)
 At Zutphen, across IJssel (Rhine, third-largest branch) - (two tracks, electrified)
 At Deventer, across IJssel - (two tracks, electrified)
 At Zwolle, across IJssel, Older bridge - (two tracks, electrified)
 At Zwolle, across IJssel, Second bridge 'Hanzelijn' 2010 - (two tracks, electrified)
 Between Utrecht and Zeist, across Kromme Rijn (east of Bunnik station) - (two tracks, electrified)
 At Utrecht central station, across Vaartsche Rijn (canal) - (four tracks, electrified; building a second bridge with four more tracks is scheduled for 2011–2012)
 At Utrecht central station, across Oude Rijn (canalised into Leidschse Rijn) (fifteen tracks + platforms; electrified).
 Between Utrecht and Vleuten, Woerden, across Amsterdam Rijn-Canal - (four tracks, electrified)
 Between Utrecht and Breukelen, Amsterdam, across Amsterdam Rijn-Canal - (four tracks, electrified)
 At Leiden central station, across Oude Rijn, towards Utrecht (city) - (two tracks, electrified)
 At Leiden, across Oude Rijn, towards Rotterdam - (four tracks, electrified)

Strategic bridges
The bridges at Huningue, Rastatt, Rüdesheim (Hindenburgbrücke) and Remagen (Ludendorffbrücke), were built for strategic military reasons only, in order to allow the Imperial German Army and later on, the Wehrmacht, to quickly transport forces by rail to Germany's western border in the event of a war with France. Unlike other bridges built for the same purpose, such as the ones at Koblenz or Cologne, these bridges were of almost no use in peacetime and thus, were never rebuilt, after their destruction during the last months of World War II, except for the one at Rastatt, which was used to supply units of the French Army stationed in the area.

References

 
Railway bridges in Germany